Chris Bentley (born 24 May 1987) is an English former rugby union footballer previously of Exeter Chiefs in Premiership Rugby. His position of choice was right sided Lock.

After starting his senior career at New Brighton he gained the chance to play for Orrell following a suspension to club stalwart Chas Cusuani. He went on to play 128 first team games (including a record 64 consecutive 1st XV starts), leaving when the club owner Dave Whelan withdrew financial support. After a brief stint with Biarritz Olympique Pays Basque in the south of France, he joined the Exeter Chiefs for one of two stints that accrued 126 first XV appearances.

Taking a sabbatical when the Chiefs moved to Sandy Park, he played in the National Provincial Championship for Tasman Mako (as founder Mako number 4) spending the New Zealand off season at Edinburgh Gunners before returning to Exeter where he was part of the promotion winning team of 2010. He played two seasons in the Gallagher Premiership joining the corporate team at the club as Sales manager for six years following his retirement.

He remains heavily involved in the sport touring Bermuda annually as part of the Classic Lions team for the World Rugby Classic and is the Rugby Players Association Alumni representative for the South of England

He now works with Devon-based marketing firm www.smithkinbaker.com

References

External links
 Exeter Profile Stat BunkerTasman NewsSigning at EdinburghBBC Career review

1979 births
Living people
English rugby union players
Exeter Chiefs players
New Brighton F.C. players
Rugby union players from Sunderland
Rugby union locks